Le Chevalier D'Eon is a 24-episode anime television series produced by Production I.G. The series was originally broadcast on the WOWOW network in Japan every Saturday from August 19, 2006 to February 24, 2007. Loosely based on the historical figure Chevalier D'Eon, the story follows the exploits of D'Eon de Beaumont as he attempts to solve the mystery behind his sister's murder while serving as a knight of France. The series was initially licensed by ADV Films, but was one of over thirty titles that were transferred to Funimation Entertainment.

The series features one opening theme and one ending theme throughout all 24-episodes. The opening theme is "BORN" by Miwako Okuda, and the ending theme is "OVER NIGHT" by Aya. "OVER NIGHT" was written specially for the series.

As of October 2007, Media Factory released the series in twelve DVD volumes that contained two episodes each. ADV Films released the series in six DVD volumes with four episodes as of December 2007. In December 2008, Funimation released a complete box set of the series DVDs, which contains all the episodes in four discs. The first two discs contain commentaries along with some of the series' episodes, an additional disc with extra content such as promotional videos and interviews with the original Japanese cast is also included.


Episode list

Home Media release

English

References
General
WOWOW Episode List Japanese

Specific

Episodes
Le Chevalier D'Eon